is a manga by Ai Yazawa. It was published  by Shueisha from 1995 to 1998 in the magazine Ribon. It was adapted by Toei Animation as a 50-episode anime series which aired on TV Asahi from September 10, 1995, to September 1, 1996, with merchandise created by Bandai. There was a movie made in 1996, and a drama CD and soundtrack were also produced. 

In Japan, the manga has been republished in a deluxe edition (dubbed "Complete Edition") in two formats: an aizōban version of four volumes in 2005 and a bunkoban version of five volumes in 2011-2012.

Viz Media announced on February 3, 2023 that they will publish the manga (the aizōban version) in English under their Shojo Beat imprint starting Fall 2023.

Story
Mikako Kōda and Tsutomu Yamaguchi are students who attend Yazawa Art Academy, a special high school for the arts in Tokyo (named after the author, who makes a cameo appearance as the school's principal). They reside in the same apartment building where they have built a long-standing friendship since infancy. However, as has been humorously pointed out by their apartment manager, Mikako and Tsutomu's feelings have undergone an unmistakable metamorphosis.

Mikako and Tsutomu's friends inside and outside of the Akindo club also detect this change and wonder one thing: Will Mikako and Tsutomu embrace what is already community discourse or will they deteriorate into leading very bitter adult lives of not-at-all-significant brevity and dysphoria?

Main characters

Primary Characters

The protagonist of the story, Mikako is driven by her dream of becoming a fashion designer and having all the stores sell her handiwork under the brand name "Happy Berry". Mikako is at her most conspicuous when she is inspired or in a stormy mood for one reason or another. The former earns her the admiration of her classmates while the latter incenses her teacher Ms. Hamada who thinks nothing of keeping her after school to revise her clumsy handiwork.  Mikako has a ferocious rivalry with Mariko who she fears will wield Tsutomu to his detriment along with unrealistic expectations of Tsutomu that leads to a very vivacious and adversarial discourse that often inflames matters on many occasions.

Unlike his fiery friend and next-door neighbor Mikako, Tsutomu is somewhat equivocal in regards what he wishes to do with his life as he synthesizes abstract art from odds and ends that he has found here and there but not his feelings about Mikako as his prologue is rife with instances where he has interceded on her behalf or otherwise come to her rescue.  Tsutomu follows Mikako's lead in forming the street market club Akindo while seeming to operate according to the proverb "Keep moving forward by doing your best in the moment." Unfortunately, as much of a chivalrous knight as he has been that has long embraced being in love with Mikako, Tsutomu is not perfect. Tsutomu's eerie corporeal similarity to the Manbou lead singer Ken Nakagawa from "Tenshi Nanka Ja Nai” has caused several fangirls mistaking him for the musician and fanatically accosting him for an autograph, being given a love letter, or being chased around all over the place. In addition to being frightened of Mikako forcing him to forego the world and the rest of his life, Tsutomu also has a very accommodating »aim to please« personality that affords easy coercion/manipulation (or in Mariko's case, seduction). Tsutomu's chaotic conduct often frustrates Mikako into prosecuting a fierce adversarial divergent concourse that has led to several impulsive comments about which neither adolescent is really sincere.

Secondary Characters

Akindo members

 Mikako’s best female friend, Risa comes from Hokkaido and her dream is to design children’s clothes. She lives with her boyfriend Takeshi, a guitarist for a local band, and is Mikako’s biggest supporter as well as (later in the series) the mother of Arashi whose best friend is George from Paradise Kiss.

 Also known as P, she is a friend of Mikako and Risa’s. Mai wears Lolita-style clothing and always carries her stuffed animal Pucci Francois with her. She makes stuffed animals to sell at Akindo and falls for Seiji.

 Has purple hair and always wears sunglasses, though Mikako gets to see his eyes during the last volume of the manga. He is close friends with Tsutomu and Yuusuke and is a computer programmer that creates various computer games.

 Tsutomu’s best friend, Yuusuke studies painting at Yazawa (although half-heartedly) and has feelings for Mariko. He’s very gruff, but has a good heart and rides a motorcycle.

Ancillary Characters

Ms. Hamada is the strict teacher of the fashion design and sewing lab classes at Yazawa that has no qualms about detaining a student after school for inattentive or clumsy handiwork -- a trap that Mikako often instigates when she is upset for one reason or another.  Strangely enough, Mikako is not sent packing by Ms. Hamada's abrasive personality or having her handiwork harshly appraised and even goes so far as to identify clumsy textile handiwork that would instigate an after-school detention at Ms. Hamada's hands. She was also the professor for Seiji and the cast of Paradise Kiss.

Noriji is the old-fashioned but well-intentioned manager of the apartment complex where Mikako and Tsutomu live.  It is his good-natured teasing that inspires the epiphany as to the metamorphosis in their mutual feelings that Mikako and Tsutomu undergo throughout the series.  Noriji also has a bit of a crush on Ruriko and demonstrates an almost paternal concern when Mikako's status is unknown.

Kouda family

Miwako is spawned as a result of her parents finally seeing the light in regards to their childish conduct and how it adversely affects Mikako. Unfortunately, little Miwako does not get to begin her postnatal life until Paradise Kiss whose inception is several years after "Neighborhood Story".

Although she is Mikako's mother, Ruriko often acts more like a co-dependent elder sister than a mother whose irresponsibility forces Mikako to maintain their home life by herself. Ruriko is often seen sleeping the morning away after all-night deadline crunches due to her job as a shoujo manga author.

Considering the conduct he demonstrates with his daughter and the sometimes erratic hours photographers like him are required to keep, Hirohiko's divorce from Ruriko when Mikako was young was probably caused by both Hirohiko and Ruriko growing apart because they failed to do the work necessary to maintain their marriage.  Fortunately, Hirohiko comes back onto the scene and does the work alongside Ruriko necessary for the two eventually reconcile and remarry.  Hirohiko is also a crucial force for Tsutomu deciding what to do with his life.

Nakasu family

 Nicknamed “Body Ko” for her usual, sultry appearance. She is popular at school and has had many boyfriends, but admits she's tired of dating men who only want her for sex.  She is in love with her childhood friend from Yokohama, Shuuichi. After going out with Tsutomu for a short amount of time, she begin a volatile relationship with Yuusuke which lasts for almost the whole length of the series.
She later marries her Shuuichi, and has a son.

 Body Ko’s little brother, he sculpts dolls and sports dreadlocks (much to Mariko's chagrin). He studies ceramics and gives his sister advice, though she doesn't want to hear it most of the time.

Tertiary Characters

 Tsutomu’s classmate who owns the shed where the group creates Akindo’s headquarters and she creates large, abstract 3-D sculptures. She likes Yuusuke and admires his paintings, but she is jealous of his relationship with Mariko. 
She later marries Yuusuke (which now makes her Ayumi Toshiro) and she is last seen pregnant with his child.

 Owns a bar which is frequented by the characters who live in Mikako’s apartment complex. Father of (later in the series) Hiroyuki Tokumori from Paradise Kiss.
Initially considered an 'older-brother' type figure to Miwako, his role is late replaced by Seiji.

 A “sparkling foreigner” who applies for the job of manga assistant for Mikako’s mother. He is saving up money to study abroad. He used to go to Yazawa for fashion, but dropped out when he realized that his passion was in hairstyling. He becomes a close friend of Mikako’s and appears in Paradise Kiss.

 Mariko's childhood friend from Yokohama. Has a girlfriend when first introduced. He later breaks up with her and the series ends with Mariko and he married, with a son.

Anime
An animated adaptation of the manga ran for 50 episodes from September 10, 1995, through September 1, 1996. Produced by Toei Animation, Asahi Broadcasting Corporation and Asatsu-DK, the series is directed by Atsutoshi Umezawa, with Aya Matsui handling series composition, Yoshihiko Umakoshi designing the characters and Masahiro Kawasaki composing the music. A DVD box set containing all episodes was released on September 28, 2005. The opening theme is "He.Ro.I.Ne", the first ending theme is "Don't You Know?!" and the second ending theme is "NG!", all sung by Rumi Shishido. The animated Gokinjo Monogatari movie has a 30-minute runtime and was released on March 2, 1996. It is an alternate retelling of the beginning of the series. It was released theatrically as a back-to-back presentation alongside Dragon Ball: The Path to Power. Ai Yazawa, the original author of the manga, makes a cameo appearance in the final episode, voicing a flea market customer.

The adaptation features a high amount of original episodes that don´t affect the plot since the original story was not completed at the time of the TV broadcast. The last chapter to be adapted is volume 4 chapter 17 in episode 49.

References

External links
Official Gokinjo Monogatari page on Shueisha's website 
Official Gokinjo Monogatari page on Toei Animation's website 

1995 anime television series debuts
1995 manga
1996 anime films
Ai Yazawa
Animated films based on manga
Asahi Broadcasting Corporation original programming
Romance anime and manga
School life in anime and manga
Shōjo manga
Shueisha franchises
Shueisha manga
Toei Animation television
TV Asahi original programming
Toei Animation films
Viz Media manga